Sazink-e Olya (also Romanized as Sāzīnk-e ‘Olyā; also known as Sāzīnak, Sāzīnk, and Sāznīk) is a village in Eskelabad Rural District, Nukabad District, Khash County, Sistan and Baluchestan Province, Iran. At the 2006 census, its population was 247, in 49 families.

References 

Populated places in Khash County